Najjar is a surname.

Najjar may also refer to:
Najjar, Iran (disambiguation), several villages in Iran
Najar, an alternative name of the Jewish Najara family

See also
Banu Najjar, the name of several Arab tribes.
Jand Najjar, small village near the city of Gujar Khan, in the district of Rawalpindi in Pakistan